Trimastix is a genus of excavates, the sole occupant of the order Trimastigida. Trimastix are bacterivorous, free living and anaerobic. When first observed in 1881 by William Kent, the morphology of Trimastix was not well described but over time the oral structure and flagellar organization have become clearer. There are few known species, and the genus's role in the ecosystem is largely unknown. However, it is known that they generally live in marine environments within the tissues of decaying organisms to maintain an anoxic environment. Much interest in this group is related to its close association with other members of Anaeromonadea.  These organisms do not have classical mitochondria, and as such, much of the research involving these microbes is aimed at investigating the evolution of mitochondria.

One species is Trimastix pyriformis.

Taxonomy
 Order Trimastigida Cavalier-Smith 2003
 Family Trimastigidae Saville Kent 1880
 Genus Trimastix Saville Kent 1880
 Species T. elaverinus Dumas 1930
 Species T. inaequalis Bernard, Simpson & Patterson 2000
 Species T. marina Kent 1880

History of Knowledge 

Trimastix were first described by William Kent in 1881 when he observed a Trimastix cell in a sample sourced from decaying fuci seaweed. He described the genera at the time as free-swimming naked animalcules that are oval, or pear shaped, with a membranous border and three flagella inserted on the anterior end. Kent observed one flagellum facing forwards and two facing backwards. It was also noted in this account that Trimastix had a visually apparent nucleus and contractile vacuole but no visual oral aperture. Kent determined that Trimastix was a distinct genus, despite similarities to Dallingeria, because of the lateral border he observed which was not present in Dallingeria.

It was later determined that the lateral border Kent was referring to was in fact the oral aperture of Trimastix, which also contained a fourth flagella. Today, the morphology of Trimastix is better understood, including details not initially observed by Kent, such as Trimastix lacking a conventional mitochondrion. Current research indicates that despite there being no strong evidence that the organelle can produce ATP, there are many mitochondrial functions that it appears to have maintained.

Habitat and Ecology 
Trimastix can only survive in anaerobic habitats, but unlike many amitochondriate anaerobes, Trimastix are not generally parasitic. Trimastix instead consume bacteria through their ventral groove. In order to maintain an anoxic environment without parasitism or endosymbiosis, Trimastix are most often found inside the tissues of dead and decaying marine vegetation.

Morphology 
Trimastix cells are oblong broad anteriorly and taper posteriorly. Trimastix is 20 µm long and 8 µm wide. A kinetid of four flagella is located on the anterior end of the cell with one flagella anteriorly oriented, two flagella posteriorly oriented, and the fourth flagella sitting within an oral groove on the ventral side.

Trimastix species do not have mitochondria, but they do have remnants of an ancestral mitochondria, in the form of a mitosome. There is no evidence this mitochondria-like organelle produces ATP, but there is evidence that the glycolytic pathway is intact within it. The mitosome also still appears to be targeted by proteins involved in amino acid metabolism, transport and maturation of proteins and transport of metabolites so it likely retains some mitochondrial function relating to those areas. Trimastix have one anterior pear-shaped nucleus that contains a large nucleolus, with the exception of Trimastix marina which has two nuclei.

References

Metamonads
Excavata genera